Abashev (masculine) or Abasheva (feminine) is a Russian last name. Variants of this last name include Abashenko, Abashin/Abashina (/), Abashkin/Abashkina (/), Abashichev/Abashicheva (/), Abashkov/Abashkova (/), and Abashurov/Abashurova (/).

There are two theories regarding the origins of these last names. The first one relates them to nicknames "" (Abash) and "" (Abasha), the diminutive forms of which are "" (Abashka), "" (Abashko), and "" (Abashur). Patronymic "" (Abashich) is also derived from these nicknames. The nickname itself has either Russian or Turkic origins. In Russian, it could have been given to people who overused the dialectal Russian word "" (abo; meaning or, if only, so that)—in this case the suffix "" (-ash-) is a standard means of forming a name. The Turkic origin theory is more plausible and traces the nickname to the Turkic root "aba" (meaning an uncle on the father's side), to which diminutive suffix "-š" was added.

The other theory traces these last names, in particular Abashin and Abashkin, to the Christian male first name Avvakum.

People with the last name
Natalya Abasheva, wife of Boris Stark, Russian missionary and priest
Timur Abashev, member of the Russian team participating in Men's 4x7.5 km relay during the Biathlon European Championships 2007
Vladimir Abashev (b. 1954), Russian philologist

See also
Abashevo, several rural localities in Russia

References

Notes

Sources
И. М. Ганжина (I. M. Ganzhina). "Словарь современных русских фамилий" (Dictionary of Modern Russian Last Names). Москва, 2001. 
Ю. А. Федосюк (Yu. A. Fedosyuk). "Русские фамилии: популярный этимологический словарь" (Russian Last Names: a Popular Etymological Dictionary). Москва, 2006. 

Russian-language surnames
